Saint Aprunculus of Trier (also known as Abrunculus) (died probably 526) was Bishop of Trier from the death of his predecessor, Fibicius, whether in 511 or 525, and served in that capacity until his own death, which is presumed to have occurred before the appointment of his successor Nicetius.

Aprunculus is venerated as a saint; his feast day at Trier is 22 April. His relics are preserved at Springiersbach Abbey. He is the patron saint of Bruchsal in Baden-Württemberg.

Life
Aprunculus may have belonged either to the disempowered pre-Frankish clergy of Trier or to the clergy sent to Trier from Auvergne by Theuderic I. There is a widespread story that Saint Gall was active in Trier at the same time as Aprunculus but this is unhistorical, as Gallus lived a century later. The absence of information on the bishops of Trier in the late 5th and early 6th centuries in contemporary sources suggests that the church in Trier was not significant politically in this period.

Veneration

Aprunculus was probably buried in a small oratory on the site of St. Symphorian's Abbey in Trier. Since the end of the 6th century he has been venerated as a saint. He is recorded in the Martyrologium Hieronymianum. Gregory of Tours mentions him.

There are reports of his veneration in Trier from the 10th century onwards, and also in Auxerre, Autun and Gellone in Languedoc. A portrait of him is found in the Egbert Psalter.

In 1047 his remains were transferred to St. Paulinus' Church, Trier, where his grave was in a small crypt under the altar of St. Clement in front of the choir. In 1107 some of the relics were taken, along with those of Saint Modoald, by Abbot Thietmar for Helmarshausen Abbey in North Hesse. Others came in 1136 to Springiersbach Abbey. At this time other bones may have been translated to the Aprunculus Chapel in the immediate vicinity of Trier Cathedral. The remaining bones in St. Paulinus' were brought into the city in 1674 before the destruction of the church. An inscribed lead plaque was removed from the coffin and placed in the reliquary.

In the area round Trier Aprunculus is patron of churches in Beßlich in Newel and Itzig (in Luxembourg).

His feast day is 22 April.

References

Holweck, F. G. A Biographical Dictionary of the Saints. St. Louis, MO: B. Herder Book Co. 1924.

Literature
 Franz-Josef Heyen, 1972: Das Stift St. Paulin vor Trier (Germania Sacra NF 6, 1; v.a. 291-294). Berlin, New York
 Hans Hubert Anton, 1987: Trier im frühen Mittelalter, pp. 86–88. Paderborn, München u.a.

External links
 https://web.archive.org/web/20140417094536/http://www.saarland-biografien.de/Abrunculus
 http://www.heiligenlexikon.de/BiographienA/Abrunculus_von_Trier.html
 http://www.palomnik.org/Svjatii/Abrunculus/Abrunculus.html

6th-century Christian saints
520s deaths
Roman Catholic bishops of Trier
Medieval German saints
Year of birth unknown
Year of death uncertain